Puerto Rican singer-songwriter Ricky Martin has released 67 singles as lead artist, seven singles as a featured artist, seven promotional singles, and six charted non-single songs. He has amassed 50 chart entries on the US Billboard Hot Latin Songs chart, including eleven number ones and 27 top tens. Martin made his chart debut on the US Hot Latin Songs with "Fuego Contra Fuego", the lead single from his 1991 self-titled debut album. It peaked at number three on the chart.

Martin's third Spanish-language album, A Medio Vivir (1995) included his international breakthrough single, "María". The song became his first entry on the US Billboard Hot 100, his first top-10 hit on the UK Singles Chart, and topped the chart in France for nine consecutive weeks, being certified Diamond after selling 1.4 million copies. The album also spawned top-five single "Te Extraño, Te Olvido, Te Amo". His fourth studio album, Vuelve (1998) spawned two number-one hits on the US Hot Latin Songs chart—"Vuelve" and "Perdido Sin Ti"—the former topped the charts in eight Latin American countries. "La Copa de la Vida" was released as the second single from the album, and became the official song of the 1998 FIFA World Cup in France. It hit the charts in more than 60 countries, and topped the charts of 30 countries, making it one of Martin's most successful songs.

Martin's first English-language album, Ricky Martin was released in 1999 and included his biggest hit "Livin' la Vida Loca". It topped the US Billboard Hot 100 for five consecutive weeks and was certified Platinum by the Recording Industry Association of America (RIAA) and double-platinum by the British Phonographic Industry. The second single from the album, "She's All I Ever Had reached number two on The US Hot 100. His second English-language album Sound Loaded (2000) spawned two international top-five singles "She Bangs" and "Nobody Wants to Be Lonely". They were both certified silver by the British Phonographic Industry (BPI) and their Spanish versions topped the US Hot Latin Songs chart. The lead single from his next Spanish-language album Almas del Silencio (2003), "Tal Vez" debuted at number one on the US Hot Latin Songs and spent eleven weeks at the top. "Jaleo" and "Y Todo Queda en Nada" from the same album, also reached the summit of the chart. Martin's 2006 live album, MTV Unplugged included two Latin American hit songs, "Tu Recuerdo" and "Pégate", which received quadruple platinum in Mexico. In 2007, Martin recorded a duet with Eros Ramazzotti, "Non siamo soli", that topped the Italian chart for eleven consecutive weeks.

In 2010, Martin released "The Best Thing About Me Is You" as the lead single from Música + Alma + Sexo (2011). It topped the US Hot Latin Songs chart and made Martin the first and only artist in history with Spanish-language entries in three decades. In 2014, "Adiós" was released as the first single from Martin's 2015 album, A Quien Quiera Escuchar. It was successful in Latin America, topping the charts in Colombia and Mexico, where it was also certified Gold. The second single, "Disparo al Corazón" received further success. The most successful single from the album was "La Mordidita", which reached number one on the US Latin Airplay, Latin Pop Airplay and topped the charts Latin America. In 2020, he released his debut Extended play, Pausa. The second single from the EP, "Tiburones" became a hit in Latin America. It peaked in the top 10 of ten Latin American countries, reaching number one in Puerto Rico for three consecutive weeks and becoming the first solo song ever to top Puerto Rico Year-End chart. Additionally, it became Martin's 49th entry on US Hot Latin Songs chart, making him the first and only artist in history to enter the chart in five different decades.

Besides material for his albums, Martin has recorded several collaborations, including successful hits in Spanish-speaking markets "Adrenalina", "Vente Pa' Ca", "Fiebre", "No Se Me Quita", and "Canción Bonita". In 2015, he released "Mr. Put It Down" (featuring Pitbull), which became Martin's first single to top the US Dance Club Songs chart. Martin earned sixteen number-one singles on the US Latin Airplay chart and is the second artist with most number-ones on this chart. On Latin Pop Airplay in the US, Martin holds the record for the most top twenty singles on this chart (fifty).

As lead artist

1990s

2000s

2010s

2020s

As featured artist

Promotional singles

Charity songs

Other charted songs

Guest appearances

Production and songwriting credits

See also 
 Ricky Martin albums discography

Notes

References 

Pop music discographies
Latin pop music discographies
Discographies of Puerto Rican artists